KwaDuma is a peak in the Drakensberg mountains on the border between Lesotho and South Africa. (Ben Macdhui is the highest peak in the Eastern Cape that does not lie on the border.)

References

Drakensberg
Mountains of the Eastern Cape